Phase space is a concept in physics, frequently applied in thermodynamics, statistical mechanics, dynamical systems, symplectic manifolds and chaos theory.

Phase space may also refer to:

 Phase Space (story collection), a collection of thematically-linked short stories in the Manifold Trilogy by Stephen Baxter
 Phase Space (album), an album by Steve Coleman and Dave Holland
 "Phase Space" (Westworld), a 2018 episode of the 2016 American TV series Westworld

See also
State space (disambiguation)